Jonathan Smith (born 31 October 1988) is an English professional footballer who is currently without a club.

Career
Born in Wigan, Smith played with the youth teams of Liverpool and Wigan Athletic before signing for Aberdeen in the summer of 2007.

After being out of the game for a year, Smith signed for Peterhead in August 2009. His time with the club was hampered by injuries and he left Peterhead at the end of the 2009/10 season.

References

External links

 (Aberdeen)
 (Peterhead)

English footballers
Aberdeen F.C. players
Liverpool F.C. players
Wigan Athletic F.C. players
1988 births
Living people
Association football forwards
Scottish Premier League players
Peterhead F.C. players
Footballers from Wigan
Keith F.C. players